Labs Ko Si Babe (International title: I Love My Babe) is a Philippine romantic-comedy drama television series aired in the primetime block of ABS-CBN. It aired from July 26, 1999, to November 10, 2000 replacing Esperanza and was replaced by Pangako Sa 'Yo. It was also broadcast on The Filipino Channel from November 1, 1999 to February 23, 2001. The program is one of the longest running series in the Philippines and is also known the first romantic comedy series in Philippine television.

The series was headlined by Jolina Magdangal and Marvin Agustin and was supported by an ensemble cast including Gloria Romero, Gina Pareño, Johnny Delgado, Princess Punzalan, Jaclyn Jose, Bembol Roco, Zsa Zsa Padilla and Willie Revillame.

Movie adaptation
After a month of the series premiering, it had a movie adaption called Hey Babe! released on August 25, 1999, produced by Star Cinema. The film was directed by Joyce Bernal.

Premise
In the town of San Clemente, the lives of four families intertwined bringing drama and a bit of comedy. Auring (Gloria Romero) and Felipa (Gina Pareño), the matriarch of their respective families, were the best of friends before becoming mortal enemies when Auring lost a sweepstakes ticket handed over her by Felipa for safekeeping; Felipa believes the ticket has won in the lottery. The conflict got bigger that their families started to become part of it, and that the romance developing in Cindy (Jolina Magdangal), daughter of Lupe (Princess Punzalan) and Kit (Johnny Delgado) and granddaughter of Auring, and Wally (Marvin Agustin), son of Viola (Carmi Martin) and Rocky (Bembol Roco) and grandson of Felipa, are caught in the cross-fire. Meanwhile, Miguel (Onemig Bondoc), who came from Italy, entered the picture and became friends with Cindy that made Wally got jealous. However, Miguel's stepmother Elena (Jaclyn Jose), known to have bad reputation, caused even more problems in the story between the Auring and Felipa families. To help bring peace in the town of San Clemente is the Mayor, Diwata or Mayor Di (Zsa Zsa Padilla), who always stand in between the fights of the families. Mayor Di chose to remain single after a dark past, but is living with her nephew Jobert (Bernard Palanca) and also the new welcome of the Barangay Captain in San Clemente Jonathan (Willie Revillame).

Cast and characters

Main cast 
 Jolina Magdangal as Cinderella "Cindy" Angeles
 Marvin Agustin as Wally Escallon

Supporting cast 
 Gloria Romero as Aurora "Auring" Mabuenas
 Gina Pareño as Felipa Escallon
 Johnny Delgado as Paquito "Kit" Angeles
 Princess Punzalan as Guadalupe "Lupe" Mabuenas-Angeles
 Jaclyn Jose as Elena Deogracia
 Bembol Roco as Silvestre "Rocky" Escallon
 Carmi Martin as Viola Pagsisihan-Escallon
 Zsa Zsa Padilla as Mayor Diwata Royales
 Onemig Bondoc as Miguel Deogracia
 Bernard Palanca as Jobert Royales
 Cheska Garcia as Gayle Deogracia
 Edgar Mortiz
 Edu Manzano as Alvin
 Dominic Ochoa as Ulysses Angeles
 Jiro Manio as Miko Escallon
 Kristopher Peralta as Tato Escallon
 Moreen Guese as Pie Angeles
 Gino Santos as Jimboy Escallon
 Roldan Aquino as Duke Deogracia
 Tanya Garcia as Alicia
 Audrey Vizcara
 Ian Galliguez as Duday
 Willie Revillame as Barangay Captain Jonathan Royales

See also
List of ABS-CBN drama series
List of programs broadcast by ABS-CBN

References

External links
 

1999 Philippine television series debuts
2000 Philippine television series endings
1990s Philippine television series
ABS-CBN drama series
Philippine comedy television series
Filipino-language television shows
Television shows set in the Philippines